Ultimate Fakebook is an American three-piece power pop band from Manhattan, Kansas, United States.

Albums and EPs 
Ultimate Fakebook has released five albums and an EP: Electric Kissing Parties (1997, Noisome Records), This Will Be Laughing Week (1999, Noisome Records & 2000, 550 Music/Epic Records), Open up and Say Awesome (2002, Initial Records), Before We Spark (EP, 2003, Initial Records) and The Preserving Machine (2020, Sonic Ritual Records).

First break-up and post break-up activities 

Shortly after releasing their 2003 EP Before We Spark they broke up.

In 2007, Melin and Warnock both appeared on VH1's World Series of Pop Culture on the team "Westerberg High".  They advanced to the quarterfinals before being eliminated by "Three Men & A Little Lazy". Together, they now run a movie review and film pop culture website, scene-stealers.com.

On December 30, 2008, Ultimate Fakebook played a small reunion show for a friend's birthday at the recordBar in Kansas City, Missouri.

On Thursday, February 5, 2009, Ultimate Fakebook reunited again, this time for a much larger "official" reunion show at the Uptown Theater in Kansas City.  This was also a benefit for the JayDoc free clinic, where licensed volunteer physicians supervise University of Kansas School of Medicine students who provide care to the area's under-served populations. The clinic operates on a volunteer basis, with supplies and medicines purchased through grants and donations.

On December 18, 19, and 20, 2009, the band opened for former touring mates and friends Motion City Soundtrack at Lincoln Hall in Chicago, Illinois.

Newer releases 
On July 27, 2010, the band self-released their first album since 2003. A digital download comprising 16 original songs and one cover, the album is entitled Daydream Radio Is Smiling Static and is available exclusively on the band's website.

As of 2013, the band are still active and played a concert in their hometown on December 28, 2013, performing material from Daydream Radio is Smiling Static.

In April 2020, they released The Preserving Machine on Sonic Ritual Records.

Members
Bill McShane - (vocals, Guitar)
Nick Colby - (Bass guitar)
Eric Melin - (drums)
Jason "Mot" Waldmann - (Drums)
J.D. Warnock - (Guitar)

Discography

External links
 Official website
  scene-stealers.com

American power pop groups
Rock music groups from Kansas
Musical groups established in 1994
American emo musical groups
Musical groups disestablished in 2003
550 Music artists